Gauleiter Telschow was a German fishing trawler that was requisitioned by the Kriegsmarine in the Second World War for use as a Vorpostenboot, serving as V 206 Gauleiter Telschow and V 209 Gauleiter Telschow.

Description
The engine was built by Deschimag Seebeck, Wesermünde and was rated at 96 nominal horsepower. It drove a single screw propeller via a low-pressure turbine, double reduction gearing and a hydraulic coupling.

History
Gauleiter Telschow was built as yard number 265 by Schiffbau-Gesellschaft Unterweser AG, Wesermünde, Germany. She was launched on 25 September 1937 and completed on 17 December. She was built for Hussmann & Hahn, Cuxhaven. The Code Letters DUBE were allocated, as was the fishing boat registration PC 307.

On 12 September 1939, she was requisitioned by the Kriegsmarine and commissioned with 2 Vorpostenflotille as the Vorpostenboot V 206 Gauleiter Telschow. On 20 October, she was redesignated V 209 Gauleiter Telschow. She was the first German naval vessel sunk by a British submarine during the Second World War.

References

Sources

1937 ships
Ships built in Bremen (state)
Fishing vessels of Germany
Steamships of Germany
Auxiliary ships of the Kriegsmarine
Maritime incidents in November 1939
World War II shipwrecks in the North Sea
Ships sunk by British submarines